The West Coast railway line runs from Padang Besar railway station close to the Malaysia–Thailand border in Perlis (where it connects with the State Railway of Thailand) to Woodlands Train Checkpoint in Singapore. It is called the West Coast railway line because it serves the West Coast states of Peninsular Malaysia.

The 1,151-kilometre line is busier than the East Coast railway line because the West Coast railway line handles a variety of passenger train services such as the KTM ETS services, the KTM Intercity services, the International Express, the KTM Komuter in the Klang Valley and Greater Penang, and freight trains. Of this total length, 759 km is double-tracked and electrified.

The major stations on the line include KL Sentral in Kuala Lumpur, Butterworth in Butterworth, Penang and JB Sentral in the south in Johor Bahru.

History
The line began with the construction of branches linking coastal ports with inland tin mining areas before they were gradually linked up by the main truck line running through the interior of the West Coast states of Peninsular Malaysia.

The latest new lines to be built were the branch lines to West Port, North Port, Tanjung Pelepas, Pasir Gudang and the North Butterworth Container Terminal.

Services
The West Coast railway line is served by a variety of train services:

 
 between Tumpat and JB Sentral.
The route between Gemas and JB Sentral is part of the West Coast Line while the route between Gemas and Tumpat is on the East Coast Line)
 between Gemas and JB Sentral.
 between JB Sentral and Woodlands Train Checkpoint
 
 (express service that only stops at a few major stations, one of 6 coaches upgraded to business class with free wifi, charging sockets, on board dining & single seats)
Between KL Sentral and Padang Besar
Between KL Sentral and Butterworth
 (stops at all major stations a few minor stations)
Between KL Sentral and Ipoh
Between Gemas and Padang Besar
Between Gemas and Butterworth
 (stops at all stations)
Between KL Sentral and Ipoh
 
  between Batu Caves and Pulau Sebang/Tampin.
  between Tanjung Malim and Port Klang.
  between KL Sentral and Terminal Skypark.
  between Butterworth and Padang Rengas.
  between Padang Besar and Butterworth.
International Express between Padang Besar and Bangkok's Krung Thep Aphiwat Central Terminal

Projects

Gemas–Johor Bahru electrification and double-tracking
After many years of announcements about the intention to upgrade the final stretch of single track of the West Coast Line, the Government began the public display exercise for the Gemas–Johor Bahru electrification and double-tracking project on 27 October 2015. The public display exercise, required for all development of new railways under Section 84 of Malaysia's Land Public Transport Act 2010, ran until 27 January 2016. Chinese company China Railway Construction Company (CRCC) has been awarded to build the Gemas–Johor Bahru electrification and double-tracking project.

The length of the line to be electrified and double-tracked is 197 km between Chainage 563.040 at Gemas to Chainage 754.180 at Johor Bahru. The upgraded line is supposed to cater for at least 22 services daily involving KTM ETS, KTM Intercity and shuttle train services. Electrification for the stretch will have the same specifications as that of the Seremban-Gemas stretch, name at 25 kV AC 50 Hz single phase and supplied via an overhead catenary. Train operations for this stretch will be integrated with the Train Control Centres at KL Sentral and Gemas. The design speed for the tracks is 160 km/h.

Construction began in 2016 and is expected to be completed by October 2022.

Klang Valley Double Track Project
The project was implemented by Keretapi Tanah Melayu began in 2016 and phase 1 is expected to be completed by 2021. This will focus on enhancing 16 stations along these routes and upgrade the existing signalling and electrification system. This will be reduced to just seven-and-a-half minutes once the KVDT is completed.

The 42km rehabilitation under Phase I, which are:  
Phase 1A (Rawang – Simpang Batu)
Phase 1B (Kuala Lumpur – Simpang Bangsar)
Phase 2 (Simpang Batu – Kuala Lumpur)
Phase 3 (Sentul – Simpang Batu)
Phase 4 (Simpang Bangsar – Salak Selatan)

Phase II is from Simpang Bangsar - Pelabuhan Klang and Salak Selatan - Seremban.

Line network

Main trunk line

The West Coast main trunk line stretches from Padang Besar on the Malaysia–Thailand border to Woodlands Train Checkpoint in Singapore.

The main trunk line is double-tracked and electrified from Padang Besar to Gemas. From Gemas to the Woodlands Train Checkpoint, the line is single-tracked and not electrified. Loops at stations allow trains to pass. Double tracking and electrification works are currently being carried out.

The West Coast railway line connects with the State Railway of Thailand at Padang Besar, while the East Coast line branches off at Gemas.

Branch lines
The West Coast railway line includes several branch lines from the main trunk line, namely:
Bukit Mertajam Junction to Butterworth
Batu Junction to Batu Caves
Port Klang/Bangsar Junction to Port Klang and Westport, with further branch lines:
Subang Jaya to Terminal Skypark at the Sultan Abdul Aziz Shah (Subang) Airport
Port Klang to Northport
Pulau Indah to various Wesport shipping terminals
Skudai Junction to the Port of Tanjung Pelepas
Kempas Baru to Pasir Gudang

The Bukit Mertajam Junction to Butterworth, Batu Junction to Batu Caves, Port Klang Junction to Port Klang station, as well as the branch lines to Terminal Skypark and Northport are double tracked and electrified.

The line from Port Klang to Westport and its shipping terminals, as well as the branch lines between Skudai Junction and the Port of Tanjung Pelepas and the Kempas Baru and Pasir Gudang are single lines and not electrified.

There are also branch lines where the tracks exist but are not used for any service or closed are:
Between Tapah Road and Teluk Intan (abandoned and not connected to the main line)
Between Seremban and Port Dickson

None of these disused branch lines are double tracked nor electrified.

Stations

Main Trunk Line

Batu Junction–Batu Caves Branch Line

Port Klang Junction–Port Klang Branch Line

Bukit Mertajam Junction–Butterworth Branch Line

See also
KTM East Coast railway line
Southern Line (Thailand)
Johor Bahru–Singapore Rapid Transit System

References

Railway lines in Malaysia
Metre gauge railways in Malaysia
Railway lines opened in 1885
1885 establishments in British Malaya